Once Lied is a 1987 Soviet drama film directed by Vladimir Bortko.

Plot 
The film tells about an artist who in the past was a rebel and a subverter of the Soviet way of life, and now has everything that a modern person needs.

Cast 
 Yury Belyayev as Aleksandr Grigoryevich Kryukov (as Yuriy Belyaev)
 Elena Solovey as Irina
 Irina Skobtseva as Anna Ivanovna
 Yuri Zvyagintsev as Yura
 Sergey Yakovlev as Ivan Semyonovich
 Irina Rozanova as Tanya
 Yevgeny Vesnik as Aleksandr's father
 Yuriy Kuznetsov as Stanislav Lapshin
 Natalya Sayko as Emma Andreyevna
 Nikolay Grinko as Stanislav Sergeyevich Sheshko

References

External links 
 

1987 films
1980s Russian-language films
Soviet drama films
1987 drama films
Films directed by Vladimir Bortko